2,6-Dihydroxybenzoic acid (γ-resorcylic acid) is a dihydroxybenzoic acid.

References

Dihydroxybenzoic acids